The King Murder is a 1932 American pre-Code mystery film directed by Richard Thorpe and starring Conway Tearle, Natalie Moorhead and Marceline Day.

Main cast
 Conway Tearle as Detective Chief Henry Barton  
 Natalie Moorhead as Elizabeth Hawthorn  
 Marceline Day as Pearl Hope  
 Dorothy Revier as Miriam King  
 Don Alvarado as Jose Moreno  
 Huntley Gordon as Arthur B. Bronnell  
 Maurice Black as Philip Scott 
 Robert Frazer as Van Kempen  
 Rose Dione as Miss Duval, Maid

References

Bibliography
 Pitts, Michael R. Poverty Row Studios, 1929-1940. McFarland & Company, 2005.

External links
 

1932 films
1930s English-language films
Films directed by Richard Thorpe
American black-and-white films
Chesterfield Pictures films
American mystery drama films
1930s mystery drama films
1932 drama films
1930s American films